, also romanized as Hidekaz Himaruya, is a Japanese manga artist from Kōriyama, Fukushima. He emigrated to the United States to study in the Parsons School of Design, but dropped out. He currently lives in Japan, and is best known for writing and illustrating the web manga series Hetalia: Axis Powers, which has been adapted into manga and an anime with seven released seasons.

Works
 (webcomic)
 (Comic Birz → Comic Spica, Gentosha)
 (Gentosha)
 (dōjinshi)
 (webcomic)
 (Jump Square, Shueisha)
 (as )

References

External links
 

1985 births
Manga artists from Fukushima Prefecture
Living people
People from Kōriyama
Japanese emigrants to the United States